Adlène Guedioura (born 12 November 1985) is a professional footballer who plays as a midfielder for Al-Wakrah in the Qatar Stars League.

At club level, Guedioura had spells at Sedan, Noisy-le-Sec, L'Entente SSG and Créteil in France, Kortrijk and Charleroi in Belgium, Wolverhampton Wanderers, Nottingham Forest, Crystal Palace, Watford, Middlesbrough and Sheffield United in England, and Al-Gharafa in Qatar.

Born in France, at international level he represented Algeria – the birthplace of his father who also played for the team – and made 63 appearances.

Guedioura is known for his powerful long-range shots. In the 2011–12 season, he won "Goal of the Season" for both Nottingham Forest and Wolverhampton Wanderers. He is thought to be the first footballer ever to win the award for two clubs in the same season.

Early life
Guedioura, born in La Roche-sur-Yon, France, to a Spanish Catalan mother (Enriqueta Soreira Pons, a former Spain Women Basketball team player), and former Algerian international striker Nacer Guedioura.

Club career

Early career 
He started playing amateur football with Racing Paris in the fifth tier of French football, where his form for the club attracted attention from Ligue 2 club Sedan, who he joined in 2004. Guedioura struggled to find any first team chances at Sedan and left the club in 2005 to join fourth-tier club Noisy-le-Sec. He made a total of 15 appearances for the club, scoring one goal.

He then moved up to the third tier with L'Entente SSG in 2006. He made a total of 21 appearances for the club, scoring 3 times. He signed for fellow French third tier side US Créteil-Lusitanos in 2007, where he scored 6 times in 24 appearances.

Belgium
Guedioura moved to Belgium in the summer of 2008, joining Belgian Pro League side Kortrijk on a two-year deal. He made a total on 10 appearances for Kortrijk. He spent just half a season with the club and moved to fellow Pro League side Charleroi in January 2009, and signed a year-and-a-half contract. He made a total of 25 appearances for the club as a captain, scoring one goal, before joining English Premier League side Wolverhampton Wanderers on loan in January 2010 until the end of the season.

Wolverhampton Wanderers
Within 24 hours of his arrival at Wolves, he made his debut as a substitute in a goalless draw against Liverpool, soon becoming a regular starter as the club ensured their survival in the Premier League for the first time. He made his first Wolves start in the 1–0 win over Tottenham, on 10 February 2010. He scored his first goal for the club in the final game of the season to earn a victory over Sunderland, after which it was confirmed that he had signed a three-year contract for an undisclosed fee, believed to be in the region of £2m.

Guedioura suffered a fractured tibia after a challenge by Aston Villa's Steve Sidwell on 26 September 2010. On 30 March, Guedioura returned for Wolves after 6 months out injured against Blackpool Reserves, playing the full 90 minutes and winning the game 2–1, with Guedioura scoring a 25-yard strike. On 9 April, Guedioura made his first team appearance after 6 months out injured for Wolves, playing 75 minutes against Premier League side Everton. On 8 May he scored his first goal of the 2010/2011 Premier League season during the 3–1 win in the local derby against West Bromwich Albion.

Nottingham Forest
On 30 January 2012, Guedioura joined Championship side Nottingham Forest on loan until the end of the season. Guedioura made his debut for Nottingham Forest in their 0–2 loss against Burnley on 31 January 2012. Guedioura was praised by Forest manager Steve Cotterill for his 'heart and soul' while playing for Forest, and Sky Sports described him as a "firm favourite with the Forest faithful" due to his "all-action displays". He scored his first and only goal for Forest in the 2011–12 season with a 35-yard strike in the 7–3 away win against Leeds United. The goal won Nottingham Forest's Goal of the Season award.

On 23 July 2012, Guedioura joined Nottingham Forest permanently for an undisclosed fee, believed to be £1m. He signed a three-year contract. He asked his Twitter followers if he should wear the 22 shirt or number 7 for the club. He announced the following day that he would be wearing number 7, which was confirmed by the club soon after.

Guedioura scored the winner for Nottingham Forest on the first day of the season, in a 1–0 win over Bristol City. On 10 November Guedioura scored an equalizer against Leicester City F.C. to make the score 1–1, the game finished 2–2. Two weeks later on 24 November he scored against his former club Wolverhampton Wanderers with a trade mark long range effort.

Crystal Palace
On 3 September 2013, Guedioura completed a late deadline day move to Premier League side Crystal Palace for an undisclosed fee, signing a three-year deal. He made his debut for the club on 14 September 2013, away to reigning league champions Manchester United, coming on as a 56th-minute substitute for José Campaña.

Watford
On 26 November 2014, Guedioura moved on loan to Watford until 1 January 2015. Guedioura scored a brace for Watford in their game against Cardiff City on 28 December 2014.

Guedioura returned from his loan deal in January 2015 and was used immediately by new manager Alan Pardew playing as a half-time substitute in a 2–1 win over Tottenham. Pardew went on to cite Guerdioura as a "maverick" and the calibre of player that Crystal Palace needed to avoid relegation.

Guedioura rejoined Watford on an emergency loan deal on 27 February 2015.

After two successful loan spells at Watford in the 2014–15 season, an agreement was reached between Crystal Palace and Watford for a permanent transfer on 1 September 2015. Guedioura signed a three-year deal with "The Hornets".

Middlesbrough
On 31 January 2017, it was announced that Guedioura had joined Premier League club Middlesbrough on a two-and-a-half-year contract for an undisclosed fee.

Return to Nottingham Forest
On 31 January 2018, transfer deadline day, it was confirmed that Guedioura had returned to Nottingham Forest, on a contract running until the conclusion of the 2020–21 season, reuniting with former Middlesbrough manager Aitor Karanka. He returned to the City Ground on a free transfer, after having his contract with Middlesbrough terminated by mutual consent. He made his first appearance for the club since his previous departure, on 10 February, when they lost 2–0 to an out-of-form Hull City side, with the Algerian being substituted off in the 77th minute of the league fixture.

Sheffield United
On 13 September 2021, Guedioura signed a one-year contract with EFL Championship side Sheffield United. On 1 February 2022, Guedioura had his contract terminated by mutual consent.

Burton Albion
On 19 February 2022, the management of the MC Oran tried to recruit him but the transfer ended in failure. Six days later, Guedioura joined EFL League One side Burton Albion on a short-term contract until the end of the 2021–22 season. On 11 April 2022, Guedioura left by mutual consent after struggling to cope with Algeria not making the 2022 FIFA World Cup.

International career

Guedioura received his first international recognition when he was included in Algeria's preliminary squad for the 2010 World Cup. He made his international debut on 28 May 2010 in a 0–3 defeat to the Republic of Ireland, before being confirmed in the final squad for the tournament in South Africa. He appeared as a substitute in all three of Algeria's group games during the competition – against Slovenia, England and the United States – where the team finished bottom of their group.

On 3 September 2010, Guedioura scored the equalizer in a 1–1 home draw with Tanzania in a 2012 African Cup of Nations qualifier, enabling the team to achieve their first point of the campaign as well as his first international goal. Ultimately Algeria failed to qualify for those finals, but Guedioura was selected for three squads which did qualify successfully, in 2013, 2017 and 2019, finishing the latter as continental champions with Guedioura named in the 'team of the tournament'.

Personal life
Guedioura is the son of former Algerian international striker, Nacer Guedioura. His younger brother Nabil Guedioura is also a footballer who played for the Crystal Palace U21 development team and at amateur level in France. Guedioura is Muslim.

Career statistics

Club

International

Scores and results list Algeria's goal tally first.

Honours

Club
Watford
EFL Championship runner-up: 2014–15

International
Algeria
 Africa Cup of Nations: 2019

Individual
 Nottingham Forest Goal of the Season: 2011–12
 Wolverhampton Wanderers Goal of the Season: 2011–12
 Watford Goal of the Season: 2015–16 (vs Arsenal in the FA Cup on 13 March 2016)
 Africa Cup of Nations Team of the Tournament: 2019

References

External links

Official personal website

1985 births
Living people
French Muslims
People from La Roche-sur-Yon
French sportspeople of Algerian descent
French people of Spanish descent
Algerian people of Spanish descent
Algerian footballers
Algeria international footballers
French footballers
CS Sedan Ardennes players
US Créteil-Lusitanos players
R. Charleroi S.C. players
K.V. Kortrijk players
Expatriate footballers in Belgium
French expatriate sportspeople in Belgium
Algerian expatriate sportspeople in Belgium
Algerian expatriate footballers
Algerian Muslims
Association football midfielders
Premier League players
Belgian Pro League players
Qatar Stars League players
Wolverhampton Wanderers F.C. players
Nottingham Forest F.C. players
Crystal Palace F.C. players
Watford F.C. players
Middlesbrough F.C. players
Al-Gharafa SC players
Sheffield United F.C. players
Burton Albion F.C. players
Al-Duhail SC players
Al-Wakrah SC players
Expatriate footballers in England
Olympique Noisy-le-Sec players
2010 FIFA World Cup players
2013 Africa Cup of Nations players
2017 Africa Cup of Nations players
2019 Africa Cup of Nations players
Algerian expatriate sportspeople in England
Expatriate footballers in Qatar
Algerian expatriate sportspeople in Qatar
English Football League players
Sportspeople from Vendée
Footballers from Pays de la Loire
French expatriate sportspeople in Qatar
French expatriate sportspeople in England